The Hawaiian flagtails are species of the genus of flagtail fishes found in the Hawaiian Islands.
Two species are Kuhlia sandvicensis and  K. xenura. K. xenura is endemic to the islands.

In the Hawaiian language, āholehole refers to the young stage, and āhole the mature fish. It was sometimes called puaa kai, literally "sea pig".
Keahole Point and the Kona International Airport located there are named for the fish.

References 

Fish of Hawaii
Kuhliidae
Endemic fauna of Hawaii
Fish common names